The League of North Kosovo (/Лига Северног Косова) is the top football regional league in North Kosovo, ranked fifth in the Serbian league system. The league is formed primarily of Serbian football clubs that come from four of North Kosovo's municipalities such as Leposavić, Zvečan, Zubin Potok and Northern Kosovska Mitrovica. The league was formed in protest to the establishment of the Kosovo Super League by the Republic of Kosovo; the Serbian clubs from North Kosovo refuse to enter the Republic of Kosovo's institutions as per the Assembly of the Community of Municipalities of the Autonomous Province of Kosovo and Metohija. 

FK Ibar Leposavić
FK Trepča
FK Kopaonik Lešak
FK Sočanica
FK Zvečan
FK Radnik Prilužje
FK Moša Banje
 
There are two other clubs from North Kosovo, FK Trepča and FK Mokra Gora, however these clubs compete in the Morava Zone League.

External links
 First League of North Kosovo at Srbijasport.net

5
North Kosovo
North Kosovo
Kosovo Serbs